Ras Baalbek I is a rock shelter  east of Ras Baalbek in the northern Beqaa Valley in Lebanon. It was first discovered by Lorraine Copeland and Peter Wescombe in 1965–1966. It was later excavated by Jacques Besançon in 1970. Retouched blades along with a pressure-flaked arrowhead and a burin were found dated to the Neolithic period.

References

1965 archaeological discoveries
Baalbek District
Archaeological sites in Lebanon
Great Rift Valley
Neolithic settlements
Rock shelters